Subcoal technology is used to process paper and plastic waste fractions into a substitute for coal or lignite. The fuel pellets can be used as a secondary energy source in industrial furnaces, such as lime kilns and cement kilns, coal-fired power stations and blast furnaces. Subcoal has a caloric value comparable with lignite. The technology was developed by the Dutch chemical company DSM. A study by CE Delft revealed that for the paper-plastic fraction of household waste, the Subcoal route has a better climate and overall environmental score as compared to the incineration in a waste incineration plant.

Production 
Because much waste ends up in incineration plants or is dumped into landfills, depending on the region, waste collection systems have advanced to separate collections for recycling allowing easier production of refuse-derived fuel. 

The technology consists of a number of different treatment stages, depending on the input waste streams. The waste streams are typically purified, with recyclables being collected and sorted out of the waste streams. The waste is dried if necessary. The material is shredded to the required size and turned into pellets, with a diameter of approximately 8 mm. Terms of calorific value, ash content, chlorine contact and moisture content are important to rate the quality of the pellets. The calorific value is comparable with (and sometimes higher than) a few types of coal. The percentage of biomass is fairly high as well; it is more than 50%. Because it is in pellets, Subcoal shows hydrophobic behavior and does not dissolve when the moisture content is increased, which is important when considering external storage. Subcoal is mostly dosed as a ground (pulverized) fuel. Subcoal is commercially used via various grinding media (direct firing); via a hammer mill (12 tons per hour), air-rotor mill (6 tons per hour) and via a bowl mill (4 tons per hour). Cement manufacturers, lime producers and energy providers spray the Subcoal powder with coal powder into their kilns.

Currently, there are two Subcoal producing facilities in the Netherlands, which have a combined output capacity of 80 to 90 thousand tons per year. One is implemented at a cardboard mill in the southern part of the Netherlands, with an annual output of about 15 thousand tons. The biggest is a standalone production facility located in the northern part of the Netherlands, with an annual output of about 70 thousand tons per year.

Content statistics

Co-grinding with coal 
Other alternative fuels tend to have greater quality fluctuations due to seasonal influences. Subcoal is hydrophobic and can thus be stored outside. This allows Subcoal to be mixed with the primary fuel in uncovered areas e.g. in the external coal storage area. The existing dosing equipment and grinding media can be used to transport the Subcoal into the power station.

Costs and savings 
The gate fee for the waste streams and the costs for logistics have to be taken into account. Typically, in Europe, the price for Subcoal (CIF) fluctuates between €1 and €2.50 per gigajoule. The fluctuation is dependent on the input prices for the waste streams which are used and the production steps.

See also. 
 Waste-to-energy
 Refuse-derived fuel

References 
 DSM
 Qlyte
 Subcoal International

Alternative fuels